Danny Chase (later called Phantasm) is a fictional superhero in DC Comics publications.

Publication history
Phantasm first appeared in The New Teen Titans Annual (vol. 2) #3 and was created by Marv Wolfman. Although Wolfman hoped the character would restore the "teen hero" feel to a group composed mostly of characters in their twenties, Danny was also intended as a comic foil for one of the group's foundational characters, Changeling.

Problematically, the character is often portrayed as an overly snide, egotistical brat. Conflicts with Beast Boy were one-sided, with Chase invariably delivering come-uppance. Meanwhile, other members of the team proved prone to commenting on how impressed they are by Chase's cleverness and capability. All of this made him something of a "Mary Sue". This quickly proved unpopular with most fans, and pro and anti-Chase letters sparked heated debate in the letter column. Wolfman tried various ways to make the character more appealing to the Titans' fan base, including having him briefly disguised as the mysterious "Phantasm" during the Titans Hunt storyline. However, negative fan pressure was strong enough to write Danny out of the series.

Years later, during Jay Faerber's run on "The Titans", he planned for new series villain Epsilon to be a resurrected Danny. Tempest's evil uncle Slizzath was supposed to have revived him as part of a planned storyline. The new editor Andrew Helfer overturned this and a new origin was given instead.

Fictional character biography
Danny Chase is a short-lived member of the New Teen Titans. He is raised by parents who are international spies. As a result, he is extensively trained in espionage, infiltration and intelligence acquisition. In addition, he is a metahuman with powerful telekinetic abilities and a near-photographic memory.

The creation of the Phantasm identity
At one point early in the Titans Hunt storyline, Danny Chase finds himself confronted by two members of the Wildebeest Society inside a shopping mall. One of them blasts him away and assumes him to be dead. He, however, survives and decides to use his telekinetic powers to assemble a costume from assorted items - a hockey mask, a bolt of fabric, and a robot-voice simulator to disguise his voice. He presents himself as the "Phantasm" in order to remain incognito.

In the end, the character willingly gives up his life to save Raven's homeworld of Azarath. He, Arella, and the disembodied souls of Azarath merge into a new entity that also refers to itself as the Phantasm. It wears Danny Chase's costume.

Danny Chase's body briefly returns as an undead slave to Brother Blood in issues #30-#31 (January-February 2006) of the third Teen Titans series (2003-2011), written by Geoff Johns.

One Year Later, Zachary Zatara mentions that he and Kid Devil went on a trip to New Azarath where they were almost eaten by the Phantasm.

During the "Blackest Night" storyline, Danny Chase's body is briefly revived as a Black Lantern. In the Blackest Night: Titans miniseries, his body is soon destroyed by a burst of white light emanating from Dawn Granger.

In 2011, "The New 52" rebooted the DC universe. Phantasm is among the many subjects kept under A.R.G.U.S.'s control.

Powers and abilities
Danny Chase possesses the power of telekinesis. Danny is also trained in espionage and has a photographic memory.

Phantasm has the combined powers of Danny Chase and Arella as well as the souls of Azarath making him a more advanced and powerful version of them along with new powers.

Other versions
In the Injustice comic, Danny is confronted by Superman of the Regime, who requires his powers to meet with Raven on Azarath.

In other media
Danny Chase appears in Young Justice: Phantoms, voiced by Jason Marsden. Debuting in the episode "Zenith and Abyss", Danny Chase is a boy who was captured by The Light, had his metahuman abilities activated, and was trafficked to Apokolips where DeSaad dissected him to create the Kaizer Thrall.

References

External links
 Danny Chase at Comic Vine

Comics characters introduced in 1988
Characters created by Marv Wolfman
DC Comics child superheroes
DC Comics metahumans
Fictional ghosts
Fictional government agents
DC Comics telekinetics
Fictional characters with eidetic memory